The 2013 European Dressage Championship, known for sponsorship reasons as the Blue Hors European Dressage Championship was held between August 21 and August 25, 2013 in Herning, Denmark. It formed part of the 2013 FEI ECCO European Championships; other disciplines included were Showjumping and Para-Dressage.

Germany, the historically dominant nation in European and World dressage, regained its European team title, which it had lost to Great Britain in 2011. The Netherlands edged out the British team, for whom Olympic team champion Laura Tomlinson was a late withdrawal, for the silver team medal.

The individual competitions were dominated by the British double Olympic champion Charlotte Dujardin, riding Valegro, winning her first European titles and edging out 2011 double individual champion Adelinde Cornelissen. Dujardin set a new Championship record in the Individual Freestyle or Kr with the second highest score ever recorded in the discipline.

The 2013 event was the 26th edition of the European Dressage Championships. Parallel to the senior European Championships, a Youth Horse Show for riders up to 25 years of age was also held.

Medal summary 

 CR - Championship Record

Medal table

Minor Competitions 
As part of the event, two individual under 25 'junior' competitions were also held. They were both won by Nanna Skodborg Merrald, as hosts Denmark dominated the medals in both disciplines.

Competitions

General 
Competition was held in the MCH Arena of Herning, in three events; the team event involved three or four horses per nation (the three best scores are counted), while individuals competed in two individual competitions, Individual Grand Prix Spécial and two days later in the individual Grand Prix Freestyle or Kúr. Unlike in the Olympic Games, scores in the two individual disciplines were not combined, and medals were awarded in each discipline separately.

At this European Championship a record number of participants started the Championship competitions. In the Team Grand Prix de Dressage 64 riders and 16 teams start. Each nation can start with a team of three or four riders, each rider with one horse.

External links 
 Official web page of the 2013 European Dressage Championship

European Dressage Championships
Dressage
Equestrian sports competitions in Denmark
Sport in Herning
2013 in Danish sport
International sports competitions hosted by Denmark